Mouse Cleaning is a 1948 one-reel animated cartoon and the 38th Tom and Jerry short. The title is a play on "house cleaning". It was produced in Technicolor and released to theatres on December 11, 1948, by Metro-Goldwyn Mayer and again on February 17, 1956. It was animated by Ray Patterson, Irven Spence, Kenneth Muse and Ed Barge, who were the usual animators for the Tom and Jerry cartoons in the early 1940s up until the late 1950s. It was directed by William Hanna and Joseph Barbera, and produced by Fred Quimby; no writer has yet been credited (though many suppose it was Hanna and Barbera). The music was scored by Scott Bradley and the backgrounds were created by Robert Gentle.

Plot 
While chasing Jerry in the garden, Tom runs through a mud puddle and then into the house, tracking mud on the kitchen floor right after Mammy Two Shoes has finished cleaning. As punishment, Mammy makes Tom clean the floor and orders him to keep the house clean, while she leaves to go shopping, or "we is gonna be minus one cat around here."

Once she is gone, Jerry wants to sabotage Tom, so he begins making a mess around the house by, among other things, emptying the ashtray onto the floor, squirting ink from a fountain pen into a pail, juggling food, bringing an old horse and pushing an ink stamp pad onto Tom's paws while he takes a nap, causing the cat to leave a long trail of paw prints in the living room.

Tom throws Jerry down the laundry chute into the basement and quickly cleans the room. As he does so, a coal truck arrives at the house to make a delivery, and Jerry uses a rope to pull the truck's delivery chute up to the living room window, causing the house to flood with coal. When Mammy returns from shopping and discovers this, she blames Tom, who flees. As he runs, Mammy throws lumps of coal at him, one of which knocks him out.

Reception 
Boxoffice reviewed the short on December 12, 1948, saying, "This is a repeat performance of a common film cartoon gag but amusing nevertheless." Film critic and historian Leonard Maltin praised the short saying it "... typifies the development of this series taking the same story idea as Puss Gets the Boot and playing it in modern Tom-and-Jerry fashion, with hilarious gags, razor-sharp timing, and riveting "takes", or reactions. For sheer belly laughs, this cartoon is difficult to top."

In 2007, this short and Casanova Cat were pulled from the Tom and Jerry Spotlight Collection - Volume 3 DVD compilation by Warner Home Video due to racial stereotypes. It had been announced that Mouse Cleaning would be available on the Tom and Jerry Golden Collection - Volume 2 on DVD and Blu-ray, with the short being presented uncut, uncensored, and restored from its original nitrate elements that had been recently discovered. However, on February 6, 2013, it was announced by TVShowsOnDVD.com that Mouse Cleaning was not part of the list of cartoons on this release, as well as the cartoon Casanova Cat, which was also skipped over on the Spotlight Collection, Volume 3 DVD release. However, the set has since been indefinitely delayed following a negative reception.

Voice cast 
 Lillian Randolph as Mammy Two Shoes (1948 original, uncredited)
 Thea Vidale as Mammy Two Shoes (1990 dubbed version, uncredited)
 William Hanna as Tom (in the style of Stepin Fetchit)

Production 
 Written & Directed by William Hanna & Joseph Barbera
 Animation: Ray Patterson, Irv Spence, Kenneth Muse & Ed Barge
 Layouts: Richard Bickenbach
 Backgrounds: Robert Gentle
 Music: Scott Bradley
 Produced by Fred Quimby

Notes 
 The scene where Tom runs far away from getting hit from the flying projectile, in this case – a lump of coal, was reused from a previous cartoon, Tee for Two.

Availability 
VHS
 Tom and Jerry's 50th Birthday Classics 3.
DVD
 The original version (with Lillian Randolph's voice) is intact on UK TV airings
 Tom and Jerry: The Classic Collection Vol. 2, and the Vol. 1–6 boxset (Region 2 DVD), uncensored.

References

External links 
 
 

1948 animated films
1948 short films
1940s English-language films
Tom and Jerry short films
Short films directed by Joseph Barbera
Short films directed by William Hanna
1940s American animated films
1940s animated short films
1948 comedy films
Films scored by Scott Bradley
Metro-Goldwyn-Mayer animated short films
American animated short films
American comedy short films
Films produced by Fred Quimby
Metro-Goldwyn-Mayer cartoon studio short films
Film controversies
African-American-related controversies in film
Race-related controversies in animation
Race-related controversies in film
Animated films about cats
Animated films about mice
African-American animated films